Merlakia Jones (born June 21, 1973) is a former American college and professional basketball player who was a guard in the Women's National Basketball Association (WNBA) for eight seasons during the 1990s and 2000s.  Jones played college basketball for the University of Florida, and then played professionally for the Cleveland Rockers and Detroit Shock of the WNBA.

Early years 

Jones was born to George and Jacqueline Jones in Montgomery, Alabama.  She attended George Washington Carver in Montgomery, and was a standout high school basketball player for the G.W. Carver Wolverines.

College career 

Jones accepted an athletic scholarship to attend the University of Florida in Gainesville, Florida, where she played for coach Carol Ross's Florida Gators women's basketball team from 1991 to 1995.

Florida statistics
Source

USA Basketball
Jones represented the US at the 1995 World University Games held in Fukuoka, Japan in August and September 1995. The team had a record of 5–1, securing the silver medal. The USA teams won early and reached a record of 5–0 when the USA beat Yugoslavia. In the semi-final game, the USA faced Russia. The team was behind much of the first half but managed to tie the game at the half. The USA broke the game open in the second half and won 101–74, with Frett contributing a double-double, 20 points and 13 rebounds. The gold medal match was against unbeaten Italy. The Italian team started strong, scoring 12 of the first 14 points of  the contest. The USA took a small lead in the second half, but the team from Italy responded with a ten-point run, and won the game and the gold medal by a score of 73–65. Jones averaged 2.3 points per game.

Professional career 

The Cleveland Rockers selected Jones in the second round (thirteenth pick overall) of the 1997 WNBA Draft, and she played for the Rockers from 1997 to 2003.  She played her WNBA final season Detroit Shock in 2004.

See also 

 List of Florida Gators in the WNBA
 List of University of Florida alumni

References

External links 
  Merlakia Jones – Official WNBA player profile

1973 births
Living people
American women's basketball players
American expatriate basketball people in Portugal
Basketball players from Montgomery, Alabama
Cleveland Rockers players
Detroit Shock players
Florida Gators women's basketball players
Women's National Basketball Association All-Stars
Universiade silver medalists for the United States
Universiade medalists in basketball
Guards (basketball)
United States women's national basketball team players